Yorkville (officially the United City of Yorkville) is a city and county seat of Kendall County, Illinois, United States. The population was 21,533 as of the 2020 census. It is a suburb of Chicago, Illinois.

History

In 1836, the city of Yorkville was settled by early pioneers. Originally, the city's main thoroughfare of Bridge Street was designed for horse-drawn carriages and pedestrians. As time passed, Hydraulic Street, which runs parallel to the Fox River, boasted a trolley that ran from Ottawa to Aurora. This part is now operated by the Illinois Railway.

At the time, Yorkville's central business district was on the south side of the Fox River and the public square was north of the river, a layout unique to the region. The public gathering place was near the river's edge. The Kendall County Courthouse was next to the downtown commercial district. Many of the city's remaining historic single-family homes are within walking distance of Bridge Street, the courthouse and Union Hall. Earl Adams was the first to settle what would become Yorkville when he built his cabin on Courthouse Hill on the south side of town in 1833. One year later, Lyman and Burr Bristol set up residency in neighboring Bristol, north of the river.

When the county of Kendall was formed in 1841, Yorkville was chosen as the county seat. After a 13-year period in which Oswego claimed that honor, voters chose to relocate the county government in 1859 to Yorkville, a more central location. The new courthouse was completed in 1864. Replaced in 1997 with a courthouse on the city's north side, the 1864 building is used by the Kendall County Forest Preserve and other organizations. Yorkville was no exception to the railroad boom. Development began and businesses sprang up in 1870 along the tracks and included Squire Dingee's pickle factory, the Yorkville Ice Cream Company and the Rehbehn Brothers button factory. A few of those buildings still remain.

The present city of Yorkville was originally two towns, Bristol to the north and the Yorkville south of the Fox River, with separate governments for more than 100 years. In 1957, Bristol and Yorkville merged, becoming the United City of Yorkville. Ellsworth Windett became the combined city's first mayor. As a part of the consolidation, the residents of both towns agreed to a uniform school district. It was in that same year high school classes began in the downtown area at the northeast corner of Van Emmon and Bridge Streets. In 1888, a two-story brick school building on West Center Street was constructed. After the construction of Circle Center School in 1968, the two-story building was closed and the space was rented by the Yorkville School District to neighboring Waubonsee Community College. Due to rising enrollment in the early 1970s, the school was reopened and renamed as Parkview Christian Academy.

Geography
Yorkville is in northern Kendall County at  (41.6657190, -88.4419490). It is bordered to the northeast by Montgomery, to the east by Oswego, and to the west by Plano.

The Fox River flows through downtown Yorkville. The city is in Bristol, Kendall, and Fox townships.

Demographics

As of the census of 2000, there were 6,189 people, 2,220 households, and 1,665 families residing in the city. The racial makeup of the city was 96.99% White, 0.42% African American, 0.19% Native American, 0.39% Asian, 0.05% Pacific Islander, 0.73% from other races, and 1.23% from two or more races. Hispanic or Latino of any race were 2.94% of the population.

There were 2,220 households, out of which 42.1% had children under the age of 18 living with them, 62.8% were married couples living together, 8.9% had a female householder with no husband present, and 25.0% were non-families. 20.5% of all households were made up of individuals, and 8.6% had someone living alone, who was 65 years of age or older. The average household size was 2.76 and the average family size was 3.22.

In the city, the population was spread out, with 30.0% under the age of 18, 7.9% from 18 to 24, 33.6% from 25 to 44, 18.7% from 45 to 64, and 9.8% who were 65 years of age or older. The median age was 33 years. For every 100 females, there were 96.7 males. For every 100 females age 18 and over, there were 91.8 males.

The median income for a household in the city was $60,391, and the median income for a family was $67,521. Males had a median income of $49,120 versus $30,977 for females. The per capita income for the city was $24,514. About 0.4% of families and 1.4% of the population were below the poverty line, including 0.9% of those under age 18 and 3.6% of those age 65 or over.

Economy
The William Wrigley Company has a large manufacturing facility in Yorkville.  Wrigley plans to start making Skittles in Yorkville. It plans to invest about $50 million to expand its Yorkville factory by 145,000 square feet by 2016.

Parks and recreation
Raging Waves waterpark, the self-proclaimed largest waterpark in Illinois, is in Yorkville.

The Marge Cline Whitewater Park (on the Fox River) opened in 2010. It is the only whitewater park of its kind in Illinois, similar to East Race in South Bend, Indiana.It offers opportunities for freestyle kayaking, slalom kayaking and river tubing. It is named after Marge Cline, former president of American Whitewater (1982-1988), National Board of Directors of American Canoe Association, President of Midwest Division of ACA, and member of the Chicago Whitewater association.

Education

The area is served by Yorkville Community Unit School District 115. Schools include Yorkville Middle School and Yorkville High School. Additionally, a small portion of Yorkville attends Oswego Community Unit School District 308.
 Autumn Creek Elementary
 Bristol Bay Elementary
 Bristol Grade School
 Circle Center Grade School
 Grande Reserve Elementary
 Yorkville Grade School
 Yorkville Intermediate School
 Yorkville Middle School
 Yorkville Freshman Academy
 Yorkville High School

Notable people 

 Jon Blackman, college and NFL football player
 Dennis Hastert, former Speaker of the House
 Mike Radja, ice hockey player, born in Yorkville
 Andy Richter, actor and comedian
 The Giving Tree Band, American indie folk rock group

In popular culture
In August 2011, the movie Man of Steel was filmed at a house built specifically for the set in Yorkville. It appeared in the movie as the Kent family farm. In the fall of 2014, that house was rebuilt for use on the set of Batman v Superman: Dawn of Justice. In 2017, the same house was used in Justice League for one small scene, then later demolished.

References

External links
 
Official website

 
Cities in Illinois
Cities in Kendall County, Illinois
County seats in Illinois
Populated places established in 1836
1836 establishments in Illinois